Astroblepus vanceae is a species of catfish of the family Astroblepidae. It can be found in the Ucayali River, Peru.

References

Bibliography
Eschmeyer, William N., ed. 1998. Catalog of Fishes. Special Publication of the Center for Biodiversity Research and Information, num. 1, vol. 1–3. California Academy of Sciences. San Francisco, California, United States. 2905. .

Astroblepus
Fish described in 1913
Freshwater fish of Peru